The Social Enterprise Academy Nigeria is an educational and capacity development institution, which awards internationally recognized certificates and qualifications in the field of social enterprise to professionals and entrepreneurs in Nigeria.  The Social Enterprise Academy Nigeria, is licensed by Social Enterprise Europe, and recognized by the Federal Ministry of Education in Nigeria.

International Affiliations 

The Social Enterprise Academy Nigeria, sponsored by the Nigerian Capital Development Fund, offers programs in line with Social Enterprise Academies around the world. At present, the Social Enterprise Academy can be found in five other countries, including Scotland, Wales, South Africa, Australia and China.

Social Enterprise Programmes 

Programmes covered at the Social Enterprise Academy Nigeria, feature a degree awarding Masters Programme in Social Enterprise and various certification programmes. These programmes options, grouped into four categories offer courses in entrepreneurship leadership and innovation strategies, public policy and administration, cooperative enterprise and social innovation.
 
Furthermore, in line with the social impact objective and government partnership, the Social Enterprise Academy Nigeria offers hundreds of enrolled students full or partial scholarships to pursue any of its programmes.

Executive Masters In Social Enterprise Programme 

The Executive Masters in Social Enterprise Programme is geared towards building and maintaining stakeholder support, securing investment, and measuring and communicating success for participants.

The programme consists of a 25-unit, seven-course curriculum comprising four core courses and three electives. Core courses are usually completed over an 18-month period in an intensive format.

Executive Education Programmes 

The Executive Education Programmes are designed to feature a wide variety of educational materials pertaining to organizational management. This category also provides custom programmes for public, social, and private sector executives. Programmes offered under this category include:

 Public Leadership and Social Innovation
 Strategies to Create Business and Social Value
 Public and Private Management of the Environment
 Financial Modelling for Social Enterprise & Non-profit
 Strategic Investment Management for Social Enterprise
 Emerging Business & Non-profit Leaders
 New Business Model in Emerging Market

Certificate Programmes 

 Introduction to Social Enterprise & Entrepreneurship
 Managing Social Enterprise
 Cooperative Enterprise
 Public Entrepreneurship
 Micro Finance and Economic Development

Fellowship Programmes 

 Introduction to Social Enterprise & Entrepreneurship (Nigeria)
 Global Social Enterprise (United Kingdom)

See also 

 Social Enterprise
 Social Entrepreneurship
 Nigerian Capital Development Fund (NCDF)

References 

 Social Entrepreneurship: The Case for Definition- Stanford Social Innovation Review, Roger L. Martin & Sally Osberg Spring 2007
 What is a social Entrepreneur?-CSEF, 2006
 Africa’s Top Social Entrepreneurs- Africa.com, 2016
 Boris Urban, (2008) "Social entrepreneurship in South Africa: Delineating the construct with associated skills", International Journal of Entrepreneurial Behavior & Research, Vol. 14 Iss: 5, pp. 346 – 364
 Social entrepreneurship in South Africa: a different narrative for a different context- Karanda & Toledano, Social Enterprise Journal Vol. 8 No. 3, 2012 pp. 201–215

Social entrepreneurship
Organizations based in Nigeria